The judo competition at the 1964 Summer Olympics was the first time the sport was included in the Summer Olympic Games. Medals were awarded in 4 classes, and competition was restricted to men only. The competition was held in the Nippon Budokan, which was built to host the competition.

Medal summary

Participating nations

A total of 72 judoka from twenty-seven nations competed at the Tokyo Games:

Medal table

References

Further reading

 
 
 Videos of the 1964 Judo Summer Olympics

External links
 

 
1964 Summer Olympics events
1964
Olympics
Olympics 1964